"What Else Can I Do" is the title of a country music song written by Tony Arata and Scott Miller. It was recorded by Patricia Conroy on her 1994 album You Can't Resist. In Canada, the song was released in 1995 by Warner Music Canada as the album's second single. In the United States, the song was released in 1996 by Intersound Records also as the album second single, but failed to chart on the Billboard Hot Country Singles & Tracks chart. The song became a Number One on the Canadian RPM Country Tracks in 1995.

Chart performance
The song debuted at number 64 on the Canadian RPM Country Tracks on the chart dated February 6, 1995 and spent 11 weeks on the chart before peaking at number 1 on April 17.

Year-end charts

References

1995 singles
1996 singles
Patricia Conroy songs
Songs written by Tony Arata
Music videos directed by Steven Goldmann
1994 songs